Glorified Magnified is a rock album released in 1972 by Manfred Mann's Earth Band.

The album was produced by Manfred Mann and Dave Hadfield (except "It's All Over..." by Manfred Mann and Tom McGuinness) at Maximum Sound Studios, London in 1972.

Track listing
Side one
"Meat" (Manfred Mann) – 4:03
"Look Around" (Chris Slade) – 5:10
"One Way Glass" (Mann, Peter Thomas) – 4:07
"I'm Gonna Have You All" (Mann) – 5:18
Side two
 "Down Home" (Mick Rogers) – 3:17
"Our Friend George" (Mann) – 3:02
"Ashes to the Wind" (Charyl Edmonds, Jonah Thompson) – 2:14
"Wind" (Mann, Rogers, Pattenden, Slade) – 1:58
"It's All Over Now, Baby Blue" (Bob Dylan) – 4:26
"Glorified Magnified" (Mann) – 4:40

Bonus Tracks (1999 Reissue)
 "Meat" (Single version) (Mann) – 3:17
"It's All Over Now, Baby Blue" (Single version) – 3:11

Personnel

Earth Band
 Manfred Mann – organ, Minimoog synthesiser, vocals
 Mick Rogers – guitar, vocals
 Colin Pattenden – bass guitar
 Chris Slade – drums

Technical
 Dave Hadfield – producer, engineer
 Manfred Mann – producer
 Tom McGuiness – producer (track 9)
 Bloomsbury Group – design

References

External links
 
 Manfred Mann's Earth Band - Glorified Magnified (1972) album credits & user reviews at ProgArchives.com
 Manfred Mann's Earth Band - Glorified Magnified (1972) album to be listened on Spotify

Manfred Mann's Earth Band albums
1972 albums
Philips Records albums
Polydor Records albums
Bronze Records albums